Frans Van den Berghen (born 25 September 1919) was a Belgian sprint canoer who competed in the late 1940s and early 1950s. Competing in two Summer Olympics, he was eliminated in the heats of the K-2 1000 m event at both the 1948 and 1952 Summer Olympics.

References

External links
 

1919 births
Possibly living people
Belgian male canoeists
Canoeists at the 1948 Summer Olympics
Canoeists at the 1952 Summer Olympics
Olympic canoeists of Belgium